Bennington is a town in Bryan County, Oklahoma, United States. The population was 334 at the 2010 census.

History
In 1853, a Presbyterian minister named A. G. Lansing established  Mount Pleasant Mission Station near present-day Matoy in the Choctaw Nation, Indian Territory. Lansing turned the mission operation over to Rev. Charles C. Copeland, who moved the mission a few miles farther south because the original site was in a boggy and remote location that was unhealthy. Copeland renamed the mission Bennington Mission Station, honoring his home town of Bennington, Vermont. A post office was established in 1873, but closed in 1878. It was reestablished in 1884. The peak population during this period was 45 people.

At the time of its founding, Bennington was located in Blue County of the Choctaw Nation.  In 1886 that portion of the county, along with portions of Atoka County and Kiamitia County, joined to form Jackson County, with its county seat at Pigeon Roost, near present-day Boswell.

The Arkansas and Choctaw Railway built through the area in 1902, and missed Bennington by two miles. Some of the buildings were dragged down to the railroad line, where a new town was established in 1903 and grew quickly to 250 people in that year. The 1910 census showed the population had about doubled to 513, then peaked at 915 in 1920, before falling to 492 in 1930.

Geography
Bennington is located at  (34.001540, -96.037608).

Demographics

As of the census of 2000, there were 289 people, 100 households, and 78 families residing in the town. The racial makeup of the town was 59.52% White, 36.68% Native American, 0.69% from other races, and 3.11% from two or more races. Hispanic or Latino of any race were 1.04% of the population.

There were 100 households, out of which 42.0% had children under the age of 18 living with them, 53.0% were married couples living together, 22.0% had a female householder with no husband present, and 22.0% were non-families. 20.0% of all households were made up of individuals, and 11.0% had someone living alone who was 65 years of age or older. The average household size was 2.89 and the average family size was 3.27.

In the town, the population was spread out, with 34.3% under the age of 18, 8.7% from 18 to 24, 28.0% from 25 to 44, 16.3% from 45 to 64, and 12.8% who were 65 years of age or older. The median age was 30 years. For every 100 females, there were 90.1 males. For every 100 females age 18 and over, there were 88.1 males.

The median income for a household in the town was $17,500, and the median income for a family was $21,667. Males had a median income of $23,750 versus $18,750 for females. The per capita income for the town was $7,414. About 35.3% of families and 37.9% of the population were below the poverty line, including 34.8% of those under the age of eighteen and 29.4% of those 65 or over.

Notable people
Shockley Shoemake, Oklahoma state legislator and lawyer.
Wes Watkins, United States Representative.

References

External links
 Encyclopedia of Oklahoma History and Culture - Bennington

Towns in Bryan County, Oklahoma
Towns in Oklahoma